Korean Air Co., Ltd., operating as Korean Air (Korean Air Lines before 1984), is the flag carrier of South Korea and its largest airline based on fleet size, international destinations, and international flights.  

The present-day Korean Air was established on March 1, 1969, after the Hanjin Group acquired government-owned Korean Air Lines, which had operated since June 1962. Korean Air is a founding member of the airline alliance SkyTeam and SkyTeam Cargo. It is one of the 10 airlines ranked 5-star airline, and the top 20 airlines in the world in terms of passengers carried and is also one of the top-ranked international cargo airlines.

Korean Air's international passenger division and related subsidiary cargo division together serve 126 cities in 44 countries. Its domestic division serves 13 destinations. The airline's global headquarters is located in Seoul, South Korea. The airline had approximately 20,540 employees as of December 2014.  

The airline was once known as "an industry pariah, notorious for fatal crashes" due to its extremely poor safety record and is one of the world's most dangerous airlines with a a large number of incidents and accidents. The airline's reputation has become less checkered as it has focused investment on improving its safety record including by hiring consultants from Boeing and Delta Air Lines. Since 1970, 17 Korean Air aircraft have been written off in serious incidents and accidents with the loss of 750 lives. Korean culture has been cited by experts as a potential factor for the airline's struggles with safety before the 2000s when the airline hired a former high-level employee with Delta Air Lines to reform KAL safety culture.

History

Founding
In 1962, government of the Republic of Korea acquired Korean National Airlines, which was founded in 1946, and changed its name to Korean Air Lines to become a state-owned airline. On 1 March 1969, the Hanjin Group acquired the state-owned airline and it is the beginning of Korean Air. Long-haul trans-pacific freight operations were introduced on April 26, 1971, followed by passenger services to Los Angeles International Airport on April 19, 1972.

Expansion
Korean Air operated international flights to destinations such as Hong Kong, Japan, Taiwan, and Los Angeles with Boeing 707s until the introduction of the Boeing 747 in 1973. In that year, the airline introduced Boeing 747s on its trans-Pacific routes and started a European service to Paris, France using the 707 and then McDonnell Douglas DC-10. In 1975, the airline became one of the earliest Asian airlines to operate Airbus aircraft with the purchase of three Airbus A300s, which were put into immediate service on Asian routes. In 1981, Korean Air opened its cargo terminal at Los Angeles International Airport. Since South Korean aircraft were prohibited from flying in the airspace of North Korea and the Soviet Union at the time, the European routes had to be designed eastbound from South Korea, such as Seoul ~ Anchorage ~ Paris.

Change to 'Korean Air'
A blue-top, silver and redesigned livery with a new corporate "Korean Air" logo featuring a stylized Taegeuk design was introduced on March 1, 1984, and the airline's name changed to Korean Air from Korean Air Lines. This livery was introduced on its MD-80s and Boeing 747-300s. It was designed in cooperation between Korean Air and Boeing. In the 1990s, Korean Air became the first airline to use the new McDonnell Douglas MD-11 to supplement its new fleet of Boeing 747-400 aircraft; however, the MD-11 did not meet the airline's performance requirements and they were eventually converted to freighters. Some older 747 aircraft were also converted for freight service. In 1984, Korean Air's head office was in the KAL Building on Namdaemunno, Jung-gu, Seoul.

Checkered safety culture and record 

Korean Air was once notorious for its abysmal safety record and high rate of fatal crashes. In 1999, Korea's President Kim Dae-jung described the airline's safety record as "an embarrassment to the nation" and chose Korean Air's smaller rival, Asiana, for a flight to the United States. 

Between 1970 and 1999, Korean Air wrote off 16 aircraft due to serious incidents and accidents with the loss of over 700 lives. In the case of Korean Air Flight 801, the National Transportation Safety Board unanimously concluded that the airline's inadequate pilot training contributed to the pilot error that caused the fatal crash.

In 1999, Delta Air Lines suspended its code-sharing relationship with Korean Air explicitly citing its poor safety record following the fatal crash of Korean Air Cargo Flight 6316. It marked the first time safety was explicitly cited as the reason for stopping a major code-sharing alliance by an airline. Other partners including Air Canada and Air France followed suit.

In 2001, the Federal Aviation Administration downgraded South Korea's aviation safety rating and blocked South Korean carriers from expanding into the United States after the country and its carriers failed to improve sufficiently following a warning the previous year. The move was driven by the country's lax oversight of its carriers including Korean Air.

The rating has since been restored as the airline invested billions of dollars to improve safety, upgrade its fleet, install new technology, and overhaul its corporate culture including hiring consultants from Boeing and Delta Air Lines. In 2002, the New York Times noted that Korean Air had been removed from many "shun lists".

Early 21st century
On 23 June 2000, along with Aeroméxico, Air France and Delta Air Lines, Korean Air founded world's major airline alliance, SkyTeam and SkyTeam Cargo, founded on 28 September 2000.

On June 5, 2007, Korean Air said that it would create a new low-cost carrier called Jin Air in Korea to compete with Korea's KTX high-speed railway network system, which offered cheaper fares and less stringent security procedures compared to air travel. Jin Air started scheduled passenger service on July 17, 2008. Korean Air announced that some of its 737s and A300s would be given to Jin Air.

In mid-2010, a co-marketing deal with games company Blizzard Entertainment sent a 747-400 and a 737-900 taking to the skies wrapped in StarCraft II branding. In August 2010, Korean Air announced heavy second-quarter losses despite record-high revenue.
In August 2010, Hanjin Group, the parent of KAL, opened a new cargo terminal at Navoi in Uzbekistan, which will become a cargo hub with regular Incheon-Navoi-Milan flights.

In 2013, Korean Air acquired a 44% stake in Czech Airlines. It sold the stake in October 2017. On May 1, 2018, the airline launched a joint venture partnership with Delta Air Lines.

In 2019, Korean Air began playing a safety video with the K-pop group SuperM. It featured the song "Let's go everywhere", which was to be released as a single. The airline also featured the group on a livery sported by a Boeing 777-300ER, with registration HL8010.

Nut rage incident 

Cho Hyun-Ah, also known as "Heather Cho", is the daughter of then-chairman Cho Yang-ho. She resigned from some of her duties in late 2014 after she ordered a Korean Air jet to return to the gate to allow a flight attendant to be removed from the aircraft. The attendant had served Cho nuts in a bag instead of on a plate. As a result of further fallout, Cho Hyun-Ah was later arrested by Korean authorities for violating South Korea's aviation safety laws.

Merger of Asiana Airlines

In November 2020 during the COVID-19 pandemic, the South Korean Government officially announced that Korean Air will acquire Asiana Airlines. The Ministry of Land, Infrastructure and Transport of the Republic of Korea will integrate subsidiaries Air Busan, Air Seoul and Jin Air to form a combined low-cost carrier which will focus on regional airports in Korea.

In March 2021, KAL announced the merger with Asiana Airlines will be delayed as foreign authorities have not approved the deal. As of 2022, the deal has not been completed as essential countries have not given their approval.

Corporate affairs and identity

Ownership 
Korean Air is owned by Hanjin Group and it is majority controlled by Hanjin KAL Corporation. The owner family of Hanjin Group is still the airline's largest and controlling, shareholder; Cho Won-tae (Walter Cho), its current chairman and CEO, is the third generation of the family to lead the airline. As of 5 June 2020, Hanjin KAL holds 29.27% of Korean Air shares.

Hubs and headquarters 
Incheon International Airport Terminal 2 and Gimhae International Airport are Korean Air's international hubs.

Korean Air's headquarters (대한항공 빌딩) is located in Gonghang-dong, Gangseo-gu in Seoul. The company also maintains a satellite headquarters campus at Incheon. Korean Air also has offices at Gimpo International Airport in Seoul. 

Korean Air's other hubs are at Jeju International Airport, Jeju and Gimhae International Airport, Busan. The maintenance facilities are located in Gimhae International Airport. The majority of Korean Air's pilots, ground staff, and flight attendants are based in Seoul and Busan.

Chaebol and nepotism
Korean Air has been cited as one of the examples of the South Korean "chaebol" system, wherein corporate conglomerates, established with government support, overreach diverse branches of industry. For much of the time between the foundation of Korean Air as Korean National Airlines in 1946 and the foundation of Asiana Airlines in 1988, Korean Air was the only airline operating in South Korea. 

The process of privatization of Korean National Airlines in 1969 was supported by Park Chung-hee, the South Korean military general president who seized power of the country through a military coup d'état; and the monopoly of the airline was secured for two decades. 

After widening the Jaebeol branches, the subsidiary corporations of Korean Air include marine and overland transportation businesses, hotels, and real estate among others; and the previous branches included heavy industry, passenger transportation, construction, and a stockbroking business. The nature of the South Korean chaebeol system involves nepotism. A series of incidents involving Korean Air in the 2000s have "revealed an ugly side of the culture within chaebeols, South Korea's giant family-run conglomerates".

Hotel ownership 
Korean Air owns five hotels: two KAL hotels on Jeju island, the Hyatt in Incheon; Waikiki Resort in Hawaii, and a hotel/office building called the Wilshire Grand Tower in Los Angeles. This building in downtown Los Angeles houses the largest InterContinental Hotel in the Americas in what is the tallest building in Los Angeles.

Aerospace research and manufacturing 
Korean Air is also involved in aerospace research and manufacturing. The division, known as the Korean Air Aerospace Division (KAL-ASD), has manufactured licensed versions of the MD Helicopters MD 500 and Sikorsky UH-60 Black Hawk helicopters, as well as the Northrop F-5E/F Tiger II fighter aircraft, the aft fuselage and wings for the KF-16 fighter aircraft manufactured by Korean Aerospace Industries and parts for various commercial aircraft including the Boeing 737, Boeing 747, Boeing 777 and Boeing 787 Dreamliner; and the Airbus A330 and Airbus A380. In 1991, the division designed and flew the Korean Air Chang-Gong 91 light aircraft. KAA also provides aircraft maintenance support for the United States Department of Defense in Asia and maintains a research division with focuses on launch vehicles, satellites, commercial aircraft, military aircraft, helicopters, and simulation systems.

In October 2012, a development deal between Bombardier Aerospace and a government-led South Korean consortium was announced, aiming to develop a 90-seat turboprop regional airliner, targeting a 2019 launch date. The consortium would have included Korea Aerospace Industries and Korean Air. While this plan did not come to fruition, in 2019, Korean Aerospace Industries nevertheless decided to conduct a two-year study to assess the feasibility of taking the lead on building a turboprop airliner.

Destinations

Codeshare agreements
Korean Air has codeshare agreements with the following airlines:

 Aeroflot
 Aerolíneas Argentinas
 Aeroméxico
 Air Europa
 Air France
 Air Tahiti Nui
 Alaska Airlines
 Aurora
 China Airlines
 China Eastern Airlines
 China Southern Airlines
 Czech Airlines
 Delta Air Lines (Joint Venture Partners)
 Emirates
 Etihad Airways
 Garuda Indonesia
 Gol Transportes Aéreos
 Hainan Airlines
 Hawaiian Airlines
 Japan Airlines
 Jin Air (Subsidiary)
 Kenya Airways
 KLM
 LATAM Brasil
 LATAM Chile
 LATAM Perú 
 Malaysia Airlines
 MIAT Mongolian Airlines
 Myanmar Airways International
 Rossiya Airlines
 Royal Brunei Airlines
 Saudia
 Shanghai Airlines
 Uzbekistan Airways
 Vietnam Airlines
 WestJet
 XiamenAir

Interline agreements
Korean Air has interline agreements with the following airlines:

 JetBlue

Korean Air is also an airline partner of Skywards, the frequent-flyer program for Emirates. Skywards members can earn miles for flying Korean Air and can redeem miles for free flights.

Fleet

Current fleet
, Korean Air operates the following aircraft:

Retired fleet
Korean Air has operated the following aircraft:

Fleet plans
At the Association of Asia Pacific Airlines Assembly in 2018, Korean Air announced that it was considering a new large widebody aircraft order to replace older Airbus A330, Boeing 747-400, Boeing 777-200ER and Boeing 777-300. Types under consideration for replacement of older widebody aircraft in the fleet include the Boeing 777X and Airbus A350 XWB.At the International Air Transport Association Annual General Meeting (IATA AGM) in Seoul, Chairman Walter Cho said Korean Air's widebody order is imminent and it is considering an extra order of Airbus A220 Family including developing version, Airbus A220-500.

In 2022, Korean Air is considering ordering a new freighter to continue the support cargo demand worldwide. Chairman of Korean Air Walter Cho said KAL is considering 2 options and looking at both.

Aircraft interiors 
Korean Air currently offers three types of first class, four types of business (Prestige) class, and standard economy class. Korean Air operates First Class on all Boeing 747-8I and parts of its 777-300ER, Airbus A380-800, Boeing 777-200ER, and -300ER fleets. Some seats are equipped as suites with doors. The airline markets Business Class as "Prestige Class" with some aircraft equipped with suites. The airline announced its introduction of Premium Economy in 2017. The first aircraft equipped with premium economy marketed as "Economy Plus" was CS300 (Airbus A220-300). The product was eliminated in 2019 due to discordance of service and profit loss. The airline also offers Economy Class.

Incidents and accidents

In the late 1990s, Korean Air was "an industry pariah, notorious for fatal crashes" due to its extremely poor safety record and being one of the world's most dangerous airlines. Safety has seemingly improved since as the airline made concerted efforts to improve standards in the early 21st century. In 2001, the Federal Aviation Administration upgraded Korea's air-safety rating while Korean Air passed an International Air Transport Association audit in 2005.

Between 1970 and 1999, many fatal incidents occurred. Since 1970, 17 Korean Air aircraft have been written off in serious incidents and accidents with the loss of 700 lives. Two Korean Air aircraft were shot down by the Soviet Union, one operating as Korean Air Lines Flight 902 and the other as Korean Air Lines Flight 007.

Korean Air's deadliest incident was Flight 007 which was shot down by the Soviet Union on September 1, 1983. All 269 people on board were killed, including a sitting U.S. Congressman, Larry McDonald. 

The last fatal passenger accident was the Korean Air Flight 801 crash in 1997, which killed 229 people of the 254 people aboard including Shin Ki-ha, a South Korean parliamentarian. The National Transportation Safety Board concluded that poor communication between the flight crew as the probable cause for the air crash, along with the captain's poor decision-making on the non-precision approach. 

The last crew fatalities were in the crash of Korean Air Cargo Flight 8509 in 1999 due to instrument malfunction and pilot error. 

The last aircraft write-off occurred in 2022, when Korean Air Flight 631 overran the runway at Mactan–Cebu International Airport while attempting to land under poor weather conditions.

See also
 List of airlines of South Korea
 List of airports in South Korea
 List of companies of South Korea
 Transport in South Korea

References

External links

 Korean Air

 
Aerospace companies of South Korea
Aircraft manufacturers of South Korea
Airlines established in 1962
Airlines of South Korea
Association of Asia Pacific Airlines
Companies based in Seoul